The Arrogant Worms is the self-titled debut album of the Canadian comedy music group The Arrogant Worms. It was released in 1992. It was the only album to include bassist Steve Wood, who left the band afterwards.  The role of bass would be taken over by John Whytock, and later by Chris Patterson.

Track listing
 "The Last Saskatchewan Pirate"
 "The Credit Song"
 "Let's Go Bowling"
 "Goin' Huntin'"
 "Don't Go Into Politics"
 "No Sale/No Store"
 "The Canadian Crisis Song"
 "The Ballad of Dan"
 "Car Full of Pain"
 "I Want to Look Like Arnold"
 "Jesus' Brother Bob"
 "The Christmas Song"

"The Last Saskatchewan Pirate"
"The Last Saskatchewan Pirate" is one of The Arrogant Worms' more popular songs, about a down-and-out farmer who takes up piracy on the Saskatchewan River, stealing shipments of grain and farm equipment from ships and barges. He goes on about a Mountie who attempts to capture him, but fails and loses his job, and proceeds to join the crew. In the end, he comments about the arrival of winter and the river freezing over, and that he's off to New Mexico to plunder there during the winter.

Live versions of this song have been included on The Arrogant Worms albums Live Bait (1997) and Semi-Conducted (2002).

The song was later covered by Captain Tractor, on their album East of Eden (1995), but the line "Cause they know that Tractor Jack is hidin' in the bay..." was changed to "Cause they know that Captain Tractor is hidin' in the bay". Hoja, a Canadian a cappella group, covered the song on their album, Have You Herd? This song has also been covered by Canadian country singer Brad Johner. The Longest Johns covered the song as "The Last Bristolian Pirate", with some of the lyrics and geographical references changed to British equivalents along the River Severn.

References

External links
Entry at discogs.com

1992 albums
The Arrogant Worms albums
Festival Records albums